Harwant S. Bains (born 1963) is a British playwright and screenwriter.

Life
Harwant Bains was brought up in a mostly Sikh community in Southall, West London.

Works

Stage plays
 The Fighting Kite. Theatre Royal Stratford East, November 1987.
 Blood. Royal Court Theatre. London: Methuen, 1989.
 True Love Stories. 
 Indian Summer. National Theatre, 1995. In Making Scenes: Short Plays for Young Actors 3, London: Methuen, 1995.

Screenplays
 Wild West. Dir. David Attwood, 1992.
 Two Oranges and a Mango. BBC, 1995.

Radio plays
 Learning the Language
 Tutti Frutti Holy Man
 Grease Monkeys

Other
 'Southall Youth: An Old-Fashioned Story', in Harwant Bains and Philip Cohen, eds., Multi-Racial Britain. London: Macmillan, 1988.

References

External links
 

1963 births
Living people
People from Southall
British Asian writers
British dramatists and playwrights
British screenwriters